Chitila is a town in the west of Ilfov County, Muntenia, Romania, situated 9 km to the north west of Bucharest. It is often seen as a satellite town of Bucharest. One village, Rudeni, is administered by the town.

Transport
Chitilia is linked to Bucharest by three bus routes (r476 and r429 ran by Ecotrans STCM, and r402 ran by STB), and the railways going to Ploiești or Târgovişte.

Natives
 Teohari Georgescu

References

Populated places in Ilfov County
Localities in Muntenia
Towns in Romania